Jon Sumrall (born July 5, 1982) is an American college football coach. He is the head football coach at Troy University, a position he has held since the 2022 season.

Coaching career
Sumrall began his coaching career at his alma mater, Kentucky, after suffering a career-ending injury. After a couple of years, he coached at San Diego under former Kentucky assistant Ron Caragher. He was also the co-defensive coordinator at Tulane for three seasons before going to Troy as their assistant head coach and special teams coordinator. 

Sumrall was named the linebackers coach at Ole Miss in January 2018. He was also reported to be a finalist for the head coaching position at Troy before Chip Lindsey was hired.

Sumrall returned to his alma mater Kentucky in 2019 as the program's inside linebackers coach. He was promoted to co-defensive coordinator in 2021.

On December 2, 2021, Sumrall was hired as the 23rd head coach of the Troy Trojans. In his first season at Troy, he guided the Trojans to a 12-2 record and an 18-12 Cure Bowl victory over the #23 ranked UTSA Roadrunners.

Head coaching record

References

External links
 
 Troy profile
 Kentucky profile
 Ole Miss profile

1982 births
Living people
American football linebackers
Kentucky Wildcats football coaches
Kentucky Wildcats football players
Ole Miss Rebels football coaches
San Diego Toreros football coaches
Troy Trojans football coaches
Tulane Green Wave football coaches
Sportspeople from Huntsville, Alabama
Coaches of American football from Alabama
Players of American football from Alabama